Manifesto is a 1988 American comedy drama film directed by Dušan Makavejev and starring Camilla Søeberg, Alfred Molina, Simon Callow and Eric Stoltz. It was filmed in what was Yugoslavia under the working title, "For a Night of Love", and is based on the novella Pour une nuit d'amour by Émile Zola. The screenplay concerns an attempt by revolutionaries to assassinate an autocratic central European monarch, and the inept police state that tries to find and stop them.

Plot
In the 1920s, the King's security chief Avanti arrives in the sleepy village of Waldheim with an array of policemen to protect the monarch on his upcoming visit. Meanwhile, the lovely Svetlana also returns to the village after 3 years away, with plans of assassination - and romance.

Cast
 Camilla Søeberg as Svetlana Vargas
 Alfred Molina as Avanti
 Simon Callow as Police Chief Hunt
 Eric Stoltz as Christopher
 Lindsay Duncan as Lily Sachor
 Rade Šerbedžija as Emile
 Svetozar Cvetković as Rudi Kugelhopf
 Chris Haywood as Wango
 Patrick Godfrey as Doctor Lombrosow
 Linda Marlowe as Stella Vargas
 Ronald Lacey as Conductor
 Tanja Bošković as Olympia
 Gabrielle Anwar as Tina
 Enver Petrovci as The King
 Zeljko Duvnjak as Martin

References

External links

1988 films
1988 comedy-drama films
Films about assassinations
Films based on works by Émile Zola
Films directed by Dušan Makavejev
Films set in the 1920s
Films shot in Yugoslavia
British comedy-drama films
Golan-Globus films
Films scored by Nicola Piovani
Films produced by Menahem Golan
Films produced by Yoram Globus
1980s English-language films
1980s British films